Ingleburn may refer to:

Ingleburn, New South Wales a place in Australia
Tetbury Avon, a river in England, known locally as the Ingleburn